Albert Karasu or Carasso (1885–1982) was a Jewish-Turkish journalist born in Ottoman Salonica.

Biography
He studied political science at the Paris Institute of Political Studies and went on to found the French-language Istanbul newspaper Le Journal d'Orient in 1918. In 1922–23 he covered the Lausanne Treaty negotiations in Lausanne, Switzerland.

The newspaper was closed down in 1971.

Notes

References

 Jewish Virtual Library, s.v. Karasu, Albert full text

Jews from Thessaloniki
Sephardi Jews from the Ottoman Empire
Writers from Thessaloniki
Turkish journalists
1885 births
1982 deaths
20th-century journalists